Lemaigre is a French surname. Notable people with the surname include:

Edmond Lemaigre (1849–1890), French organist, conductor, and composer
Jacques Lemaigre-Dubreuil (1894–1955), French activist, publisher, and businessman
Jim Lemaigre, Canadian politician
Nicolas Lemaigre (born 1980), French footballer

French-language surnames